Petchmorakot Petchyindee Academy (born February 14, 1994), formerly known as Phetmorakot Wor Sangprapai, is a Thai Muay Thai kickboxer, originally from the Ubon Ratchathani province, Northeast of Thailand, but now fighting out of Bangkok. Phetmorakot's brand of Muay Thai is distinguished by his slicing elbows and devastating knees.

Phetmorakot was the 130 lbs. Lumpinee Stadium champion, and former 105 lbs Lumpinee Stadium champion.

Additionally, he competes for the Singapore-based organization ONE Championship in their all-striking ONE Super Series format, where he has fought in both Muay Thai and kickboxing. He is the former and inaugural ONE Muay Thai Featherweight World Champion. As of October 6, 2022, he was ranked #1 in the ONE Featherweight Muay Thai rankings.

He holds wins over fighters such as Auisiewpor Sujibamikiew,   Kwankaw, Wanchai Sor Kitisak, Pokaew, Petpanomrung Kiatmuu9, Liam Harrison, and the well known Saenchai PKSaenchaimuaythaigym.

Muay Thai career
On March 25, 2011, Phetmorakot defeated Wanchai Sor Kittisak to win the Lumpinee Stadium mini flyweight (105 lbs) title.

On April 9, 2013, he defeated Thong Puideenaidee at Lumpinee Stadium to win the Thailand super bantamweight (122 lbs) title.

On December 3, 2013, Phetmorakot won his second Lumpinee title by defeating Auisiewpor Sujibamikiew to capture the vacant Lumpinee Stadium super featherweight (130 lbs) title. On February 28, 2014, he defeated Kwankhaw Mor Ratanabandit to retain the Lumpinee Stadium super featherweight title. He successfully defended his Lumpinee Stadium title a third time by defeating Genji Umeno via unanimous decision in Japan on April 19, 2015.

On October 9, 2014, he defeated the legendary Saenchai PKSaenchaimuaythaigym by decision after five rounds of battle at Rajadamnern Stadium.

On December 8, 2015, Phetmorakot defeated Petchboonchu FA Group at Lumpinee Stadium to win the Thailand super lightweight (140 lbs) title, marking his second Thai national Muay Thai title victory.

On December 25, 2015, Phetmorakot defeated future Glory Featherweight Champion Petpanomrung Kiatmuu9 to win the Toyota Vigo Marathon 62 kg Tournament.

On July 29, 2016, Phetmorakot later entered the one-night Toyota Hilux Revo Superchamp Tournament that took place in Tokyo, Japan. In the Quarter Finals, he defeated Masashi Hirano by second-round TKO due to a cut. He then defeated Chamuaktong Fightermuaythai in Semi Finals by decision. In the Tournament Final, he defeated Silarit Chor Sampeenong by second-round KO to win the Toyota Hilux Revo Superchamp 63.5 kg Tournament.

On October 28, 2016, Phetmorakot defeated Azize Hlali by second-round KO at YOKKAO 21 in Hong Kong.

On April 28, 2018, Phetmorakot defeated Mohamed Souanane by TKO at Phoenix Fighting Championship 7 in Phuket to win the Phoenix Fight Championship 149 lb title.

On October 4, 2019 at the Hilux Revo Muay Thai Marathon in Chiang Rai, Phetmorakot defeated Ali Ebrahimi by second-round KO to win the WBC Muaythai Diamond Middleweight Championship. As a result, he became the fourth fighter to win a WBC Diamond Championship belt.

ONE Championship
On June 23, 2018, Phetmorakot Petchyindee Academy made his ONE Championship debut at ONE Championship: Pinnacle of Power, where he defeated Fabrice Fairtex Delannon by TKO in the second round.

Next, on October 6, 2018, he faced Alaverdi Ramazanov at ONE Championship: Kingdom of Heroes, where he lost by unanimous decision.

He would bounce back on December 7, 2018 at ONE Championship: Destiny of Champions, where he defeated Liam Harrison by second-round knockout.

On March 8, 2019, he defeated Kenta Yamada by unanimous decision at ONE Championship: Reign of Valor.

ONE Kickboxing Featherweight World Grand Prix
Phetmorakot was later selected as a competitor in the ONE Super Series Kickboxing Featherweight World Grand Prix, which included other fighters like Yodsanklai Fairtex and Giorgio Petrosyan. His opponent in the Quarter-Finals was Giorgio Petrosyan.

On May 17, 2019, Phetmorakot faced Giorgio Petrosyan in the Kickboxing Featherweight World Grand Prix Quarter-Finals at ONE Championship: Enter the Dragon, where he won a closely contested split decision. However, the result of the fight was overturned to a no-contest when reviews showed that Phetmorakot had used illegal clinching throughout the fight. A rematch was scheduled for July 12, 2019 at ONE Championship: Masters of Destiny, where Phetmorakot lost by unanimous decision and was eliminated from the Kickboxing Featherweight World Grand Prix.

Post-Grand Prix
On November 22, 2019, Phetmorakot defeated Charlie Peters by second-round KO at ONE Championship: Edge Of Greatness.

ONE Featherweight Muay Thai World Champion
Phetmorakot is scheduled to face Jamal Yusupov for the inaugural ONE Featherweight Muay Thai World Championship at ONE Championship: Warrior's Code on February 7, 2020. However, Yusupov was later forced to withdraw from the match and Phetmorakot will now face fellow Thai fighter Detrit Sathian Muay Thai for the ONE Featherweight Muay Thai Title. Detrit was later pulled from the bout and was replaced by Pongsiri P.K.Saenchaimuaythaigym, who took the fight on just two days' notice. Phetmorakot would defeat Pongsiri by unanimous decision to become the first ONE Featherweight Muay Thai World Champion.

Phetmorakot made a defense of the ONE Featherweight Muay Thai World Championship for the first time against Muay Thai legend Yodsanklai Fairtex at ONE Championship: No Surrender on July 31, 2020. He successfully retained the title with a split decision victory over Yodsanklai.

Phetmorakot was scheduled to make his second defense of the ONE Featherweight Muay Thai World Championship against Magnus Andersson at ONE Championship: A New Breed 3 on September 18, 2020. Phetmorakot won the fight via third-round knockout.

Phetmorakot was scheduled to make his third title defense against Jamal Yusupov at ONE: Full Circle on February 25, 2022. The bout was later cancelled, and Phetmorakot was re-booked to face Jimmy Vienot at ONE 157 on May 20, 2022. Petchmorakot won the fight by split decision.

Phetmorakot made his fourth ONE Featherweight Muay Thai title defense against Tawanchai P.K. Saenchaimuaythaigym at ONE 161 on September 29, 2022. He lost the fight and title by unanimous decision.

Due to a disagreement between his gym, Petchyindee Academy, and ONE Championship, all Petchyindee fighters were released from the promotion at the request of the gym.

Titles and accomplishments
ONE Championship 
ONE Featherweight Muay Thai World Champion (One time; inaugural)
Three successful title defenses
Performance of the Night (One time) 
WBC Muay Thai
2019 WBC Muay Thai Diamond Middleweight Champion
Phoenix Fighting Championship 
2018 Phoenix Fight Championship 149 lbs/68 kg World Champion
Toyota Hilux Revo Superchamp
2016 Toyota Hilux Revo Superchamp 63.5 kg Tournament Champion
Professional Boxing Association of Thailand (PAT) 
2015 Thailand Super Lightweight 140 lbs Champion
2013 Thailand Super Bantamweight 122 lbs Champion
Lumpinee Stadium 
2013 Lumpinee Stadium Super Featherweight 130 lbs Champion
2011 Lumpinee Stadium Mini Flyweight 105 lbs Champion

Professional boxing record

Muay Thai record

|-  style="background:#CFC;"
| 2023-03-11|| Win ||align=left| Oussama Elkoche || RWS + Petchyindee, Rajadamnern Stadium || Bangkok, Thailand || KO (Flying knee) ||2  ||2:01 
|-  style="background:#cfc;"
| 2022-12-09 || Win ||align=left| Reza Ahmadnezhad|| Rajadamnern World Series || Bangkok, Thailand || Decision (Unanimous) || 3 || 3:00
|-  style="background:#fbb;"
| 2022-09-29 || Loss ||align=left| Tawanchai P.K. Saenchaimuaythaigym || ONE 161 || Kallang, Singapore || Decision (Unanimous) || 5||3:00 
|-
! style=background:white colspan=9 |
|-  style="background:#cfc;"
| 2022-05-20|| Win ||align=left| Jimmy Vienot ||  ONE 157
 || Kallang, Singapore || Decision (Split) || 5 || 3:00 
|-
! style=background:white colspan=9 |
|-  style="background:#cfc;"
| 2021-04-02|| Win ||align=left| Thananchai Rachanon || Muaymanwansuk, Rangsit Stadium || Rangsit, Thailand ||Decision ||5 ||3:00
|-  style="background:#cfc;"
| 2020-09-18|| Win ||align=left| Magnus Andersson || ONE Championship: A New Breed 3 || Bangkok, Thailand || TKO (Referee stoppage) || 3 || 2:57  
|-
! style=background:white colspan=9 |
|-  style="background:#cfc;"
| 2020-07-31|| Win ||align=left| Yodsanklai Fairtex || ONE Championship: No Surrender || Bangkok, Thailand || Decision (Majority) || 5 || 3:00  
|-
! style=background:white colspan=9 |
|-  style="background:#cfc;"
| 2020-02-07 || Win ||align=left| Pongsiri P.K.Saenchaimuaythaigym || ONE Championship: Warrior’s Code || Jakarta, Indonesia || Decision (Unanimous) || 5 || 3:00 
|-
! style=background:white colspan=9 |
|-  style="background:#cfc;"
|  2019-11-22 || Win || align="left" | Charlie Peters ||  ONE Championship: Edge Of Greatness || Kallang, Singapore || KO (Knee to Body) || 2 || 1:48
|-  style="background:#cfc;"
|  2019-10-04 || Win || align="left" | Mohammad Siasarani Kojouri ||  Hilux Revo Muay Thai Marathon || Chiang Rai, Thailand || KO (Knee to Body) || 2 ||  
|-
! style=background:white colspan=9 |
|-  style="background:#fbb;"
|  2019-07-12 || Loss || align="left" | Giorgio Petrosyan ||  ONE Championship: Masters Of Destiny || Kuala Lumpur, Malaysia || Decision (Unanimous) || 3 || 3:00 
|-
! style=background:white colspan=9 |
|-  style="background:#c5d2ea;"
|  2019-05-17 || NC || align="left" | Giorgio Petrosyan ||  ONE Championship: Enter the Dragon || Kallang, Singapore || NC (Illegal clinching) || 3 || 3:00
|-
! style=background:white colspan=9 |
|-  style="background:#cfc;"
|  2019-03-08 || Win || align="left" | Kenta || ONE Championship: Reign of Valor || Yangon, Myanmar || Decision (Unanimous) || 3 || 3:00
|-  style="background:#cfc;"
| 2018-12-07|| Won||align=left| Liam Harrison || |ONE Championship: Destiny of Champions || Kuala Lumpur, Malaysia || KO (Left Elbow) || 2 || 1:15
|-  style="background:#fbb;"
| 2018-10-06 || Loss ||align=left| Alaverdi Ramazanov || ONE Championship: Kingdom of Heroes  || Bangkok, Thailand || Decision (Unanimous) || 3 || 3:00
|-  style="background:#cfc;"
| 2018-06-23 || Win||align=left| Fabrice Delannon|| |ONE Championship: Pinnacle of Power || Beijing, China || TKO (Doctor Stoppage/Cut by Elbow) || 2 || 0:45
|-  style="background:#cfc;"
| 2018-04-28 || Win || align=left|  Mohamed Souane  || Phoenix Fighting Championship 7 || Phuket, Thailand || TKO (Doctor Stoppage/Elbow)|| 2 ||
|-
! style=background:white colspan=9 |
|-  style="background:#cfc;"
| 2018-03-08 || Win ||align=left| Manasak Sor Jor LekMuangnon || Rajadamnern Stadium || Bangkok, Thailand || Decision || 5 || 3:00
|-  style="background:#cfc;"
| 2018-02-10 || Win ||align=left| Fabian Hundt ||  Top King World Series - TK17  || China || Decision (Unanimous) || 3 || 3:00
|-  style="background:#cfc;"
| 2017-11-09|| Win ||align=left| Manasak Sor Jor LekMuangnon || Rajadamnern Stadium || Bangkok, Thailand || Decision || 5 || 3:00
|-  style="background:#cfc;"
| 2017-09-05|| Win ||align=left| Chujaroen Dabransarakarm || Lumpinee Stadium || Bangkok, Thailand || Decision || 5 || 3:00
|-  style="background:#cfc;"
| 2017-04-06|| Win ||align=left| Yodpanomrung Jitmuangnon || Rajadamnern Stadium || Bangkok, Thailand || Decision || 5 || 3:00
|-  style="background:#fbb;"
| 2016-12-09 || Loss ||align=left| Manasak Sor Jor LekMuangnon || Lumpinee Stadium  || Bangkok, Thailand || Decision || 5 || 3:00
|-
|-  style="background:#cfc;"
| 2016-10-28 || Win ||align=left| Azize Hlali || Yokkao 21 || Hong Kong, China || KO || 2 || 
|-
|-  style="background:#fbb;"
| 2016-10-06 || Loss ||align=left| Manasak Sor Jor LekMuangnon || Rajadamnern Stadium || Bangkok, Thailand || Decision || 5 || 3:00
|-  style="background:#cfc;"
| 2016-09-05 || Win ||align=left| Yodpanomrung Jitmuangnon || Rajadamnern Stadium || Bangkok, Thailand || Decision || 5 || 3:00
|-  style="background:#cfc;"
| 2016-07-29 || Win ||align=left| Silarit Chor Sampeenong || Toyota Hilux Revo Superchamp Tournament, Final || Tokyo, Japan || KO (Left Body Cross) || 2 || 3:00 
|-
! style=background:white colspan=9 | 
|-  style="background:#cfc;"
| 2016-07-29 || Win ||align=left| Chamuaktong Fightermuaythai || Toyota Hilux Revo Superchamp Tournament, Semi Finals || Tokyo, Japan || Decision || 3 || 3:00
|-
|-  style="background:#cfc;"
| 2016-07-29 || Win ||align=left| Masahi Hirano || Toyota Hilux Revo Superchamp Tournament, Quarter Finals || Tokyo, Japan || TKO (Cut Stoppage) || 2 || 3:00
|-  style="background:#fbb;"
| 2016-05-09 || Loss ||align=left| Petpanomrung Kiatmuu9 || Rajadamnern Stadium || Bangkok, Thailand || Decision || 5 || 3:00
|-
! style=background:white colspan=9 |
|-  style="background:#cfc;"
| 2016-04-07 || Win ||align=left| Yodpanomrung Jitmuangnon || Rajadamnern Stadium || Bangkok, Thailand || Decision || 5 || 3:00
|-  style="background:#fbb;"
| 2016-03-07 || Loss ||align=left| Petpanomrung Kiatmuu9 || Rajadamnern Stadium || Bangkok, Thailand || Decision || 5 || 3:00
|-  style="background:#cfc;"
| 2016-02-20|| Win ||align=left| Design Rajanont || Lumpinee Stadium || Bangkok, Thailand || Decision || 5 || 3:00
|-  style="background:#CCFFCC;"
| 2015-12-25 || Win ||align=left| Petpanomrung Kiatmuu9 || Toyota Vigo Marathon Tournament Finals 2015, Final || Chon Buri, Thailand || Decision || 3 || 3:00
|-
! style=background:white colspan=9 |
|-  style="background:#CCFFCC;"
| 2015-12-25 || Win||align=left| Aranchai Kiatphataraphan || Toyota Vigo Marathon Tournament Finals 2015, Semi Final || Chon Buri, Thailand || Decision|| 3|| 3:00
|-  style="background:#cfc;"
| 2015-12-08 || Win ||align=left| Petchboonchu FA Group || Lumpinee Stadium || Bangkok, Thailand || Decision || 5 || 3:00
|-
! style=background:white colspan=9 |
|-  style="background:#cfc;"
| 2015-11-10 || Win ||align=left| Chujaroen Dabransarakarm || Lumpinee Stadium || Bangkok, Thailand || Decision || 5 || 3:00
|-  style="background:#CCFFCC;"
| 2015-09-25 || Win||align=left|  Brian Denis  || Toyota Vigo Marathon Tournament 2015, Final || Nakhon Sawan, Thailand || Decision || 3 || 3:00
|-
! style=background:white colspan=9 |
|-  style="background:#CCFFCC;"
| 2015-09-25 || Win||align=left|  Kringkai Tor Silachai  || Toyota Vigo Marathon Tournament 2015, Semi Final || Nakhon Sawan, Thailand || Decision || 3 || 3:00
|-  style="background:#CCFFCC;"
| 2015-09-25 || Win||align=left|  Manowan Sitongpetchyinde  || Toyota Vigo Marathon Tournament 2015, Quarter Final || Nakhon Sawan, Thailand || Decision || 3 || 3:00
|-  style="background:#cfc;"
| 2015-08-07|| Win ||align=left| Chujaroen Dabransarakarm || Lumpinee Stadium || Bangkok, Thailand || Decision || 5 || 3:00
|-  style="background:#fbb;"
| 2015-06-11 || Loss ||align=left| Kwankhao Mor.Ratanabandit || Rajadamnern Stadium || Bangkok, Thailand || Decision || 5 || 3:00
|-
|-  style="background:#cfc;"
| 2015-04-19 || Win||align=left| Genji Umeno || REBELS || Japan || Decision(Unanimous) || 5 || 3:00
|-
! style=background:white colspan=9 |
|-  style="background:#cfc;"
| 2015-03-06 || Win ||align=left| Kwankhao Mor.Ratanabandit || Lumpinee Stadium || Bangkok, Thailand || Decision || 5 || 3:00
|-  style="background:#fbb;"
| 2015-02-05 || Loss ||align=left| Kwankhao Mor.Ratanabandit || Rajadamnern Stadium || Bangkok, Thailand || Decision || 5 || 3:00 
|-
! style=background:white colspan=9 | 
|-  style="background:#cfc;"
| 2014-11-25 || Win ||align=left| Saeksan Or. Kwanmuang || Lumpinee Stadium || Bangkok, Thailand || Decision || 5 || 3:00
|-  style="background:#cfc;"
| 2014-10-31 || Win ||align=left| Stewart Pringle || Toyota Tournament show || Bangkok, Thailand || KO (knees) || 3 || 
|-  style="background:#cfc;"
| 2014-10-09 || Win ||align=left| Saenchai PKSaenchaimuaythaigym || Rajadamnern Stadium || Bangkok, Thailand || Decision || 5 || 3:00
|-  style="background:#fbb;"
| 2014-08-13 || Loss ||align=left| Saeksan Or. Kwanmuang || Rajadamnern Stadium || Bangkok, Thailand || Decision || 5 || 3:00
|-  style="background:#fbb;"
| 2014-07-08 || Loss ||align=left| Kongsak sitboonmee  || Lumpinee Stadium || Bangkok, Thailand || Decision || 5 || 3:00
|-  style="background:#cfc;"
| 2014-06-11 || Win ||align=left| Petpanomrung Kiatmuu9 || Rajadamnern Stadium || Bangkok, Thailand || Decision || 5 || 3:00
|-  style="background:#c5d2ea;"
| 2014-05-08 || Draw ||align=left| Kongsak sitboonmee  || Rajadamnern Stadium || Bangkok, Thailand || Decision || 5 || 3:00
|-  style="background:#cfc;"
| 2014-04-04 || Win ||align=left| Petpanomrung Kiatmuu9 || Southern Thailand || Bangkok, Thailand || Decision || 5 || 3:00
|-  style="background:#cfc;"
| 2014-02-28 || Win ||align=left| Kwankhao Mor.Ratanabandit || Lumpinee Stadium || Bangkok, Thailand || Decision || 5 || 3:00 
|-
! style=background:white colspan=9 | 
|-  style="background:#fbb;"
| 2014-02-07 || Loss ||align=left| Singtongnoi Por.Telakun || Lumpinee Stadium || Bangkok, Thailand || Decision || 5 || 3:00
|-  style="background:#fbb;"
| 2014-01-03 || Loss ||align=left| Kaimukkao Por.Thairongruangkamai || Lumpinee Stadium || Bangkok, Thailand || Decision || 5 || 3:00
|-  style="background:#cfc;"
| 2013-12-03 || Win ||align=left| Auisiewpor Sujibamikiew || Lumpinee Stadium || Bangkok, Thailand || Decision || 5 || 3:00 
|-
! style=background:white colspan=9 | 
|-  style="background:#cfc;"
| 2013-10-29 || Win ||align=left| Phet Utong Or. Kwanmuang || Lumpinee Stadium || Bangkok, Thailand || Decision || 5 || 3:00
|-  style="background:#fbb;"
| 2013-09-04 || Loss ||align=left| Petpanomrung Kiatmuu9 || Rajadamnern Stadium || Bangkok, Thailand || Decision || 5 || 3:00
|-  style="background:#cfc;"
| 2013-08-08 || Win ||align=left| Palangtip Nor Sripuang || Rajadamnern Stadium || Bangkok, Thailand || TKO (ref stoppage) || 4 || 
|-  style="background:#cfc;"
| 2013-07-12 || Win ||align=left| Yokwithaya Petsimean || Lumpinee Stadium || Bangkok, Thailand || Decision || 5 || 3:00
|-  style="background:#cfc;"
| 2013-06-07 || Win ||align=left| Pokaew Fonjangchonburi || Lumpinee Stadium || Bangkok, Thailand || TKO (knees)  || 3 || 
|-
! style=background:white colspan=9 |
|-  style="background:#cfc;"
| 2013-05-03 || Win ||align=left| Khunsueklek Or Kwanmuang || Lumpinee Stadium || Bangkok, Thailand || KO (Elbow) || 3 || 
|-  style="background:#cfc;"
| 2013-04-09 || Win ||align=left| Thong Puideenaidee || Lumpinee Stadium || Bangkok, Thailand || Decision || 5 || 3:00
|-
! style=background:white colspan=9 |
|-  style="background:#fbb;"
| 2013-03-07 || Loss ||align=left| Phet Utong Or. Kwanmuang|| Rajadamnern Stadium || Bangkok, Thailand || Decision || 5 || 3:00
|-  style="background:#cfc;"
| 2013-02-07 || Win ||align=left| Thong Puideenaidee || Rajadamnern Stadium || Bangkok, Thailand || Decision || 5 || 3:00
|-  style="background:#cfc;"
| 2013-01-03 || Win ||align=left| Tingtong Chor Koiyuhaisuzu || Rajadamnern Stadium || Bangkok, Thailand || Decision || 5 || 3:00
|-  style="background:#cfc;"
| 2012-09-11 || Win ||align=left| Saksuriya Kaiyanghadaogym || Lumpinee Stadium || Bangkok, Thailand || Decision || 5 || 3:00
|-  style="background:#cfc;"
| 2012-08-17 || Win ||align=left| Ekmongkol Kaiyanghadaogym || Lumpinee Stadium || Bangkok, Thailand || Decision || 5 || 3:00
|-  style="background:#cfc;"
| 2012-07-12 || Win ||align=left| Yokwithaya Petseemuann || Lumpinee Stadium || Bangkok, Thailand || Decision || 5 || 3:00
|-  style="background:#fbb;"
| 2012-07-10 || Loss ||align=left| Manasak Narupai || Lumpinee Stadium || Bangkok, Thailand || TKO (kicks and punches) || 3 || 
|-  style="background:#cfc;"
| 2012-03-30 || Win ||align=left| Mongkolchai Kwaitonggym || Lumpinee Stadium || Bangkok, Thailand || Decision || 5 || 3:00
|-  style="background:#fbb;"
| 2012-02-24 || Loss ||align=left| Panomrunglek Kiatmuu9 || Lumpinee Stadium || Bangkok, Thailand || Decision || 5 || 3:00
|-  style="background:#fbb;"
| 2011-12-09 || Loss ||align=left| Mongkolchai Kwaitonggym || Lumpinee Stadium || Bangkok, Thailand || Decision || 5 || 3:00
|-  style="background:#cfc;"
| 2011-11-09 || Win||align=left| Panomrunglek Kiatmuu9 || Rajadamnern Stadium || Bangkok, Thailand || Decision || 5 || 3:00
|-  style="background:#cfc;"
| 2011-09-13 || Win ||align=left| Choknamchai Sitjagung || Lumpinee Stadium || Bangkok, Thailand || Decision || 5 || 3:00
|-  style="background:#cfc;"
| 2011-07-29 || Win ||align=left| Mondam Sor Wirapon || Lumpinee Stadium || Bangkok, Thailand || Decision || 5 || 3:00
|-  style="background:#cfc;"
| 2011-05-10 || Win ||align=left| Wanheng Menayothin || Lumpinee Stadium || Bangkok, Thailand || Decision || 5 || 3:00
|-  style="background:#cfc;"
| 2011-03-25 || Win ||align=left| Wanchai Sor Kittisak || Lumpinee Stadium || Bangkok, Thailand || Decision || 5 || 3:00
|-
! style=background:white colspan=9 | 
|-  style="background:#fbb;"
| 2011-02-04 || Loss ||align=left| Mondam Sor Wirapon || Lumpinee Stadium || Bangkok, Thailand || Decision || 5 || 3:00
|-  style="background:#cfc;"
| 2010-12-31 || Win ||align=left| Nongbonlek Kaiyanghadaogym || Lumpinee Stadium || Bangkok, Thailand || TKO || 2 || 
|-
| colspan=9 | Legend:

References

Middleweight kickboxers
Welterweight kickboxers
Petchmorakot Petchyindee Academy
Living people
1993 births
Petchmorakot Petchyindee Academy
ONE Championship kickboxers
ONE Championship champions